Francisco Bozán (born 21 October 1986), is a Chilean footballer coach and former player.

Career 
Bozán was born in Santiago, Chile. He graduated as coach at the INAF, where he got an average of 6.7, the best historical of that institution, which allowed him to go to specialize to Spain to get the UEFA Pro Licence in the year 2012 at the premises of the Spanish selection. It also has the title of a psychologist in the UNIACC.

In 2014, he became the youngest manager of the Chilean tournament to handle the A.C. Barnechea, of the Chilean Primera Division at 27 years. He had previously been coach of Municipal Hijuelas of the Chilean Tercera B and Deportes Santa Cruz, in the Chilean Tercera Division.

On 1  November 2016, he became the new coach of Universidad de Concepción. After finishing on the last place in the 2019 Chilean Primera División, Bozán was fired on 10 December 2019. Three days later, he was hired as manager of Deportes La Serena.

In June 2021, he joined San Luis de Quillota in the Primera B de Chile.

References

External links
 Profile at Soccerway

1986 births
Living people
Footballers from Santiago
Chilean footballers
Association football midfielders
AFC Bournemouth players
Unión San Felipe footballers
A.C. Barnechea footballers
English Football League players
Chilean Primera División players
Tercera División de Chile players
Chilean football managers
Universidad de Concepción managers
Deportes La Serena managers
San Luis de Quillota managers
Primera B de Chile managers
Chilean Primera División managers
Chilean psychologists
People from Santiago
People from Santiago Province, Chile
People from Santiago Metropolitan Region
Chilean expatriate footballers
Chilean expatriate sportspeople in England
Expatriate footballers in England